Vice Versa is a 1916 British silent fantasy film directed by Maurice Elvey and starring Charles Rock, Douglas Munro and Guy Newall. It is an adaptation of the 1882 novel Vice Versa by Thomas Anstey Guthrie. The screenplay concerns a schoolboy who magically swaps places with his pompous father.

Cast
 Charles Rock – Paul Bultitude
 Douglas Munro – Marmaduke Paradine
 Guy Newall – Dick Bultitude
 Edward O'Neill – Doctor Grimstone

References

External links
 

1916 films
British silent feature films
1910s English-language films
Films directed by Maurice Elvey
1910s fantasy films
British fantasy films
British black-and-white films
Body swapping in films
Films based on British novels
1910s British films
Silent horror films